Acraga perbrunnea is a moth of the family Dalceridae. It is found in Colombia and Peru. The habitat consists of tropical lower montane moist (maybe also dry) and tropical premontane (or lower montane) wet forests.

The length of the forewings is about 14 mm. The forewings are brownish red and thinly scaled. The hindwings are transparent yellow with a pale orange fringe, especially around the anal angle.

References

Dalceridae
Moths described in 1927